M. Hanumantha Rao may refer to
Madapati Hanumantha Rao, Indian politician
Moturu Hanumantha Rao, Indian politician
Mynampally Hanumantha Rao, Indian politician